The 1974 All-Ireland Senior Camogie Championship Final was the 43rd All-Ireland Final and the deciding match of the 1974 All-Ireland Senior Camogie Championship, an inter-county camogie tournament for the top teams in Ireland.

Cork led the first game by a point at half-time, and the game stayed close right to the end. Kilkenny sealed their first-ever title in the replay, having led 2–1 to 1–0 at half-time and retaining that lead to the end.

References

All-Ireland Senior Camogie Championship Finals
All-Ireland Senior Camogie Championship Final
All-Ireland Senior Camogie Championship Final
All-Ireland Senior Camogie Championship Final
All-Ireland Senior Camogie Championship Final, 1974